The 2009–10 Nevada Wolf Pack men's basketball team represented the University of Nevada in the 2009–10 college basketball season. This was head coach David Carter's first season as head coach after being a Wolf Pack assistant coach for the previous ten years. They are members of the Western Athletic Conference and play their home games at the Lawlor Events Center. The Wolf Pack finished the season 21–13, 11–5 in WAC play and lost in the semifinals of the 2010 WAC men's basketball tournament. They were invited to the 2010 National Invitation Tournament where they advanced to the second round before falling to Rhode Island.

Pre-season
In the WAC preseason polls, released October 20 via media teleconference Nevada was selected to finish 2nd in the coaches poll and received one first place vote. So. Luke Babbitt and Jr. Armon Johnson were selected to the coach's All-WAC first team and Babbitt was selected as pre-season WAC player of the year.

The media poll almost mirrored the coaches poll as the Wolf Pack were selected to finish 2nd and received 12 first place votes, Babbitt and Johnson were selected to the All-WAC first team and Babbitt was selected as the media WAC pre-season player of the year.

2009–10 team

Roster
Source

Coaching staff

2009–10 schedule and results
Source
All times are Pacific

|-
!colspan=9| Exhibition

|-
!colspan=9| Regular Season

|-
!colspan=9| 2010 WAC men's basketball tournament

|-
!colspan=9| 2010 National Invitation Tournament

Season highlights
On November 23, Sr. Joey Shaw was named the WAC player of the week for the second week of the season with weekly averages of 20.5 PPG, 9.0 RPG, 2.5 AST and 61.9 FG%.

On January 11, So. Luke Babbitt was named the WAC player of the week for the ninth week of the season with weekly averages of 23.0 PPG, 10.5 RPG, 3.0 AST and 58.3 FG%.

On February 15, Jr. Armon Johnson was named the WAC player of the week for the fourteenth week of the season with weekly averages of 23.5 PPG, 1.5 RPG, 5.5 AST and 50.0 FG%.

References

Nevada
Nevada Wolf Pack men's basketball seasons
Nevada
Nevada Wolf Pack men's bask
Nevada Wolf Pack men's bask